The 2022 Burnley Borough Council election took place on 5 May 2022 to elect members of Burnley Borough Council in England. This election was held on the same day as other local elections.

Results summary

Ward results

Bank Hall

Briercliffe

Brunshaw

Cliviger with Worsthorne

Coalclough with Deerplay

Daneshouse with Stoneyholme

Gannow

Gawthorpe

Hapton with Park

Lanehead

Queensgate

Rosegrove with Lowerhouse

Rosehill with Burnley Wood

Trinity

Whittlefield with Ightenhill

References

Burnley
2022
2020s in Lancashire
May 2022 events in the United Kingdom